Hypholoma brunneum is a species of mushroom in the family Strophariaceae. It was originally described in 1899 by George Edward Massee as Flammula brunnea. Derek Reid transferred it to the genus Hypholoma in 1954.

References

External links

Hypholoma
Fungi described in 1899
Fungi of Australia
Fungi of New Zealand